Jayantilal Barot (24 August 1942 - 23 September 2017) was a politician from Bharatiya Janata Party and a member of the Parliament of India representing Gujarat in the Rajya Sabha, the upper house of the Indian Parliament during 10/04/2002 to 09/04/2008. He was chairman of Gujarat Backward Class Corporation till 2017.

External links
 Profile on Rajya Sabha website

References

Bharatiya Janata Party politicians from Gujarat
Rajya Sabha members from Gujarat
2017 deaths
1942 births
Rajya Sabha members from the Bharatiya Janata Party